Edwin Horace "Jack" Ellis is a New Zealand rugby league footballer who represented New Zealand.

Playing career
Ellis played in the Canterbury Rugby League competition and represented Canterbury in 1924.

He played in six matches for New Zealand during the 1925 tour of Australia. No test matches were played during the tour.

References

New Zealand rugby league players
New Zealand national rugby league team players
Canterbury rugby league team players
Rugby league props
Rugby league second-rows